Socioscientific Issues (SSI) are controversial social issues which relate to science. They are ill-structured, open-ended problems which have multiple solutions.

SSI are utilized in science education in order to promote scientific literacy, which emphasizes the ability to apply scientific and moral reasoning to real-world situations.  Some examples of SSI include issues such as genetic engineering, climate change, animal testing for medical purposes, oil drilling in national parks, and "fat taxes" on "unhealthy" foods, among many others.  Research studies have shown SSI to be effective at increasing students' understanding of science in various contexts, argumentation skills, empathy, and moral reasoning.

Goals of SSI 
Supporters of SSI argue that it can:
 1) Cultivate scientifically literate citizens who are able to apply evidence-based scientific content knowledge to real-world socioscientific scenarios;
 2) Foster a collective social conscience whereby students consistently reflect upon the formation and implications of their own reasoning;
 3) Encourage argumentation skills that are essential for thinking and reasoning processes and mirror the types of discourse utilized in real-world scientific deliberations;
 4) Promote critical thinking skills, such as analysis, inference, explanation, evaluation, interpretation, and self-regulation Science educators often refer to all of these aspects together as,"functional scientific literacy."

Historical Context of SSI

Scientific Literacy - Vision I and II 
Scientific literacy has been defined by two competing visions. A Vision I approach to scientific literacy is characterized by content-driven, decontextualized science knowledge.  A Vision II approach to scientific literacy is a context-driven, student-centered approach which seeks to prepare students for informed civic engagement.  The SSI framework follows a Vision II approach as it is believed to provide an opportunity for contextualized learning of science content as well as an opportunity for moral development.

SSI Distinguished from Science, Technology, and Society (STS) 
SSI is conceptually related to Science, Technology, and Society (STS) education.  However, while both approaches connect science to societal issues, SSI is distinguished from STS because of its emphasis on the development of character and virtue as well as content knowledge.

SSI and Moral Reasoning 
Research suggests that SSI creates cognitive dissonance by compelling students to consider claims that may be at odds with their own beliefs and values. Dissonance of this nature is believed by some to advance moral reasoning by ‘empowering students to consider how science based issues and the decisions made concerning them reflect, in part, the moral principles and qualities of virtue that encompass their own lives, as well as the physical and social world around them.'

Research Supporting SSI 
SSI education has been empirically investigated and linked to particular outcomes including:
• Promoting developmental changes in reflective judgment;
• Moving students to more informed views of the nature of science;
• Increasing moral sensitivity and empathy;
• Increasing conceptual understanding of scientific content;• Increase students’ ability to transfer concepts and scaffold ideas;
• Revealing and reconstructing alternative perceptions of science;
• Facilitating moral reasoning;
• Improve argumentation skills;
• Promote understanding of eco-justice and environmental awareness; and
• Engage students’ interest in the inquiry of science.

More recently, SSI research has been focused on cross-cultural comparisons and research has reflected international partnerships. It has been hypothesized by some that more advanced stages of epistemological reasoning allows individuals to apply a kind of socioscientific reasoning (SSR) akin to scientific habits of mind. SSR is a theoretical construct that entails the ability to tap key traits while negotiating SSI. These include skepticism, complexity, multiple perspective and inquiry.

SSI in the Classroom 

Teachers utilize SSI to foster understanding of science content and consequences involved in everyday scientific issues.  For example, in a study of ecology, an elementary class might consider whether pesticides confer more benefit or harm to our ecosystem. This type of analysis would require students to research the interactions between organisms in food webs and food chains, as well as the human impacts of pesticides. Students could make evidence-based decisions and discuss them through various means including whole-class discussions, debates, online discussion boards, etc... Similarly, older grades might consider issues such as whether genetic engineering should be used to treat genetic diseases.

This type of analysis would require extensive study of genetics and modern genetic engineering techniques, as well as the ethical issues involved in personal freedoms, religious prohibitions on intervention, and so on.  Advocates suggest that, through evidence-based discourse, students learn to formulate their own informed decisions and understand those whose views differ from themselves.  An essential aspect of the implementation of SSI is that the teacher is not promoting any particular belief; rather, the teacher's role is to promote evidence-based critical thinking and argumentation.

References 

Science education
Social sciences
Politics of science
Science and technology studies